Holiday Engagement (originally titled A Thanksgiving Engagement) is a 2011 film starring Bonnie Somerville, Shelley Long and Jordan Bridges. It premiered on Hallmark Channel on November 28, 2011.

Plot
Always struggling in life and love, Hillary Burns constantly feels the pressure to marry from her demanding mother, Meredith. Finally, this holiday season, she thinks she finally has it right. Hillary assures her meddling mother that her handsome new fiancé is coming to the Burns’ family home for Thanksgiving weekend to finally meet her crazy clan. But when the workaholic lawyer suddenly breaks up with her, Hillary has to scramble to find a replacement or risk facing her mother's wrath. After posting an ad online, she hires David, an out-of-work actor, to pose as her fiancé in front of her mom, her dad and her snobbish sister Trish. Soon, her fake engagement starts to feel real when she begins falling for David. Can Hillary find a way to turn this replacement into the real deal? Or will her overbearing mother find out the truth before the holiday is through?

Cast
 Bonnie Somerville as Hillary Burns 
 Shelley Long as Meredith Burns 
 Jordan Bridges as David
 Haylie Duff as Trisha Burns
 Sam McMurray as Roy Burns 
 Jennifer Elise Cox as Connie 
 Susie Castillo as Lindsay
 Sam Pancake as Julian
 Chris McKenna as Jason King
 Carrie Wiita as Joy Burns
 Edi Patterson as Sophie
 Christopher Goodman as Peter
 Stewart Scott as Frank
 Tomas Kolehmainen as Gill (as Nick Angel)

Reception
Pittsburgh City Paper said, "Holiday Engagement is a fun watch, with just enough laughs and romance to get you through its 97 minute run time."

References

External links
 
 
 

2011 comedy films
Hallmark Channel original films
American comedy films
Films about weddings
Films directed by Jim Fall
2011 films
2010s English-language films
2010s American films